Kelly Kenny Wiltshire (born June 28, 1972) is a former linebacker who played ten seasons in the Canadian Football League from 1997 to 2006 for four teams.  He was a CFL Eastern All-Star twice.

During his playing career, Wiltshire set the CFL record for most consecutive games played in the regular season with 157. His ironman streak ended on September 30, 2005 when he was unable to play in a game for the Edmonton Eskimos against the Calgary Stampeders due to an injury.

As of 2010, Wiltshire is an officer with the Ontario Provincial Police.

References

External links
Career Bio

1972 births
Living people
Canadian football linebackers
Edmonton Elks players
James Madison Dukes football players
Montreal Alouettes players
Ontario Provincial Police officers
Ottawa Renegades players
Players of Canadian football from Quebec
Canadian football people from Montreal
Toronto Argonauts players
Anglophone Quebec people